Monica Marie Bisordi (born October 21, 1982) is a former American artistic gymnast. She competed for the University of Arizona from 2002 - 2005. She is the University of Arizona's all-time leading scorer with 2,120.790 career points.

Personal life
Monica was born in Daly City, California, the daughter and eldest child of Jim and Carol Bisordi. As a baby, Monica was diagnosed with nocturnal epilepsy. Her father, Jim, discovered that by keeping his firstborn active on a daily routine, the seizures could be controlled. So Monica never went on medication; instead she kept active with gymnastics.

Monica is the oldest of four children.  She married fellow University of Arizona student Frank Orrell in 2012.  They have three daughters. Monica and her family recently moved back to California after living on Oahu for five years.  Her oldest brother, Matt, was a diver for the University of Texas before transferring to the University of Arizona after his sophomore year. His diving score contributed to the NCAA Swimming and Diving Championship in 2008. Her younger brother James was a collegiate basketball player and 6X national diver.  Her sister, Jaclyn, was the starting point guard (3 of her 4 years) point guard at Sonoma State University. In her last semester of her final year she was the women's basketball student coach and she ran cross county.

Monica attended Notre Dame High School, a private, All-Female, Catholic, college preparatory high school in Belmont, California.

Monica graduated from the University of Arizona with a major in communications and a minor in sociology.

Monica was a certified pilates instructor in San Mateo, California before moving to Oahu.  Currently she is happy raising her daughters on Northern California's coast.

Early gymnastics history
Monica was a four-year member of the Airborne Gymnastics Club from 1998 - 2001. She was a level 10 competitor and a five-time national competitor.

Achievements & Awards
1997: Magnificent 10 Performer (Bars)
1997: National Junior Team Member
1999: Regional All-Around Champion
2000: National Beam Champion
2001: Regional Floor Champion
2001: Regional Vault Champion
2001: Regional All-Around Champion
2001: State All-Around Champion

College gymnastics career
Monica amassed 49 individual titles (3x Vault, 5x Bars, 15x Beam, 10x Floor, 16x All-Around), 163 top 5 finishes and 2,120.790 total points in her four-year career at Arizona.

2005
14 Individual Titles (1x Vault, 1x Bars, 6x Beam, 2x Floor, 4x All-Around)
40 Top 5 Finishes
503.815 Total Points

2004
14 Individual Titles (2x Vault, 2x Bars, 1x Beam, 5x Floor, 4x All-Around)
44 Top 5 Finishes
610.500 Total Points

2003
17 Individual Titles (2x Bars, 6x Beam, 3x Floor, 6x All-Around)
47 Top 5 Finishes
576.725 Total Points

2002
4 Individual Titles (2x Beam, 2x All-Around)
32 Top 5 Finishes
429.750 Total Points

Achievements & Awards
2005: South Central Region Co-Gymnast of the Year
2005: First Team All-Pac-10 (All-Around)
2005: Pac-10 Gymnast of the Week (Feb. 14-21)
2004: Second Team All-America (Floor)
2004: First Team All-Pac-10 (All-Around)
2004: Pac-10 Gymnast of the Week (Feb. 2-8)
2002: First Team All-Pac-10 (Beam, All-Around)

References

External links
 Arizona Wildcats Bio

Living people
1982 births
American female artistic gymnasts
21st-century American women